The 2016 Speediatrics 200 was the 8th stock car race of the 2016 NASCAR Camping World Truck Series, and the 8th iteration of the event. The race was held on Saturday, June 18, 2016, in Newton, Iowa, at Iowa Speedway, a 0.875-mile (1.408 km) permanent tri-oval shaped racetrack. The race took the scheduled 200 laps to complete. William Byron, driving for Kyle Busch Motorsports, made a late-race pass with 10 laps to go, and earned his third career NASCAR Camping World Truck Series win, and his second consecutive win. Byron dominated the majority of the race, leading 107 laps. To fill out the podium, Cole Custer, driving for JR Motorsports, and Cameron Hayley, driving for ThorSport Racing, would finish 2nd and 3rd, respectively.

Background 

It has over 25,000 permanent seats as well as a unique multi-tiered RV viewing area along the backstretch. The premiere event of the track is the Hy-Vee IndyCar Race Weekend held yearly in July since its inaugural running in 2007.

Entry list 

 (R) denotes rookie driver.
 (i) denotes driver who is ineligible for series driver points.

Practice

First practice 
The first practice session was held on Friday, June 17, at 2:00 pm CST, and would last for 1 hour and 25 minutes.

Final practice 
The final practice session was held on Friday, June 17, at 5:00 pm CST, and would last for 55 minutes.

Qualifying 
Qualifying was held on Saturday, June 18, at 3:45 pm CST. Since Iowa Speedway is under 1.5 miles (2.4 km) in length, the qualifying system a multi-car system that included three rounds. The first round was 15 minutes, where every driver would be able to set a lap within the 15 minutes. Then, the second round would consist of the fastest 24 cars in Round 1, and drivers would have 10 minutes to set a lap. Round 3 consisted of the fastest 12 drivers from Round 2, and the drivers would have 5 minutes to set a time. Whoever was fastest in Round 3 would win the pole. 

Donnie Levister would fail to qualify.

Full qualifying results

Race results

Standings after the race 

Drivers' Championship standings

Note: Only the first 8 positions are included for the driver standings.

References 

NASCAR races at Iowa Speedway
June 2016 sports events in the United States
2016 in sports in Iowa